Dyson House was a building which was part of Sheffield Hallam University's city campus in Sheffield, South Yorkshire, England. The building was on Sheaf Square, next to the Sheffield Midland Station. Dyson House became unused by the university for several years, and was bought by Yorkshire Forward as part of the Heart of the city scheme funded by EU regeneration money and has now been demolished. The site along with the adjacent Sheaf House has a proposal for a new  office block, shops and 200 apartments in a mixed use scheme of a futuristic modern design by Make Architects (Ken Shuttleworth) designers of the acclaimed Swiss Re (Gerkin) building in London.

See also
Heart of the City - City centre regeneration scheme

References
 Sheffield Telegraph Report - From 18 January 2008

Demolished buildings and structures in Sheffield
Education in Sheffield